Wójtowo may refer to the following places:
Wójtowo, Lidzbark County in Warmian-Masurian Voivodeship (north Poland)
Wójtowo, Gmina Barczewo in Warmian-Masurian Voivodeship (north Poland)
Wójtowo, Gmina Kolno in Warmian-Masurian Voivodeship (north Poland)